Chloride channel Kb, also known as CLCNKB, is a protein which in humans is encoded by the CLCNKB gene.

Chloride channel Kb (CLCNKB) is a member of the CLC family of voltage-gated chloride channels, which comprises at least 9 mammalian chloride channels. Each is believed to have 12 transmembrane domains and intracellular N and C termini. Mutations in CLCNKB result in the autosomal recessive Type III Bartter syndrome.

See also
 Chloride channel
 BSND,  barttin, accessory subunit beta for this channel

References

Further reading

External links
 
 

Ion channels